Elections to North-East Fife Council were held in May 1984, the same day as the other Scottish local government elections.

Election results

Ward results

References

1984 Scottish local elections
1984
May 1984 events in the United Kingdom